XIII: The Conspiracy is a 2008 Franco-Canadian television film in two parts, based on the eponymous graphic novel series by Belgian authors Jean Van Hamme and William Vance, about an amnesiac protagonist who seeks to discover his concealed past. The film served as a pilot for XIII: The Series, which aired on television in 2011.

The film was directed by Duane Clark, stars Val Kilmer and Stephen Dorff, and was produced by Prodigy Pictures and Cipango Films. It was first broadcast in France in October 2008 by Canal+; followed by NBC in the USA in February 2009; by Nine in Australia (as The Conspiracy) in November 2009; and by Five in the United Kingdom in December 2009 (where it was shown as a single feature instead of in two parts).

Plot

The first female president of the United States, Sally Sheridan, (Mimi Kuzyk) is killed by a sniper during her speech at Veterans Day. Her assassin narrowly escapes after a shoot out involving a shadowy figure named La Mangouste (Val Kilmer) or "The Mongoose". Three months later in West Virginia, an elderly couple discover a young man (Stephen Dorff) who lies wounded above on a tree in a parachute. He cannot remember his past and the only clue to his identity is a numerical tattoo on his chest, "XIII", the Roman numeral for 13.

Meanwhile, in the White House, a joint intelligence task force led by Colonel Amos (Greg Bryk) is frantically conducting the search for the President's killer. With the presidential elections just weeks away, a confirmed suspect could swing the vote for the incumbent administration. Regaining his health, XIII searches for more information about the imprint on his body using the couple's home computer. This leads to his location being picked up by the NSA and in no time at all a squad of elite special forces swarm the couple's house in Cape Fear, killing them both. XIII takes out the soldiers one by one. While on the run in New York, he befriends Sam (Caterina Murino), a photo shop owner who helps identify for him a woman in a photo he carries.

Here he attempts to access a memory card found on his person in the hopes of discovering his identity and unknowingly initiates its tracking program. As a result, rogue Secret Service agents track him down at the woman's abandoned apartment, but he fights them off and escapes back to his place where La Mangouste captures him. XIII later awakens to find himself restrained inside a truck where La Mangouste demands to know who he has spoken to. He also reveals to XIII that he is also a part of the conspiracy having been branded "XII". Escaping out of his hands XIII returns to Sam where she informs him that the design on his chest refers back to the ancient Roman Empire wherein secret societies would brand members loyal to their cause. She then gives him some photos that Kim (Jessalyn Gilsig), the woman in the photo, had developed there, which convinces him to head upstate to Kellownee Valley.

Meanwhile, government intelligence has identified XIII from video surveillance as Steven Rowland and plasters his face all over the media to weed him out. He turns up at Kim's house in Kellownee Valley where she, along with her father, General Carrington (Stephen McHattie) and Jones, a CIA operative, have been waiting for him. He learns that he was a former special ops agent who underwent facial reconstruction surgery and placed undercover assuming Rowland's identity. The goal of his assignment was to flush out a group of fascists plotting a coup to overthrow the American government whom Rowland had unwittingly been recruited for. Ensconced within the highest echelons of power, the conspirators run their own security agency alongside the government's.

During this time, Amos and his agents have the house surrounded and move in along with La Mangouste who fires at XIII, but misses and kills Kim instead. The only way now for XIII to get his own life back is to play bait, which is a dangerous game now since he still doesn't know who he really is. A televised presidential debate is interrupted to broadcast that XIII has been captured.

Amos has XIII wired up and tortured in order to extract a confession out of him, but his pleas that he is not really Rowland are met with incredulity. He is taken back to his holding cell and while there it is discovered from his X-rays that he has had reconstructive surgery and that his military file is classified. Inside his cell he meets another member of the conspiracy, "XIV", who attempts to silence him once and for all, but he escapes with the help of Jones. Due to Amos's incompetence, he is suspended from the investigation and President Galbrain (John Bourgeois) authorizes Calvin Wax (Jonathan Higgins), the White House Chief of Staff, to take over.

Meanwhile, XIII and Jones are transported to an NSA safehouse where Carrington reveals XIII's true identity as Ross Tanner. He shows him photos of his wife and daughter whom he lost in the sarin gas attacks in Chicago, which was one reason he originally accepted the mission. Carrington also reveals to him that Col. Jack McCall (Scott Wickware) had previously supervised the paramilitary unit Rowland was involved with that orchestrated the foreign attacks at home and abroad in Haditha, Iraq and that he had believed that the next major target of attack would coincide with the upcoming elections.

XIII and Jones then travel to a decommissioned facility in northern Montana and here XIII witnesses McCall in a teleconference exchange with Wax and accosts him. He attempts to determine the location of the attack, but McCall commits suicide. XIII then seizes everything McCall had on hand. Back at the safehouse, he and Jones evaluate the evidence, which points to a nuclear strike on election day at a Maryland polling station and inform Carrington, who gets into a heated exchange with Amos, after he accuses him of involvement in the cover up. Simultaneously, Wax observes Amos and Carrington together, and orchestrates Carrington's arrest on suspicion of high treason.

Later, XIII and Jones research online about Jasper Winthrow, CEO of Standard Electronics, of which a subsidiary company is Stratus Dynamics, the second largest military contractor in the world. Jones mentions that Sheridan's plan to scale down America's presence in Iraq and cut billions from the defense budget would be bad for Winthrow's business. XIII then notices a logo of one of Winthrow's subsidiary companies, Ardent Glass (AG), which he recalls seeing previously. Thus, XIII and Jones travel to AG's former factory in Petersburg, Virginia, where the conspirators have scheduled a meeting. He gets into a fight with La Mangouste and kills him.

Back at the safehouse, XIII identifies the people who he saw at the meeting and tells Jones he overheard them make an enigmatic reference to the location that pinpoints the target as Bethesda, Maryland. Amos then shows up at the safehouse after Carrington had sent him to find out the truth from Jones and XIII. Together they organize to thwart the plot.

XIII and Jones head to Maryland where he confronts the woman delivering the bomb and stops her.

Wally Sheridan, the assassinated President's brother, wins the national elections. XIII then confronts Wax in his office who claims that it is only the beginning before he kills himself. Carrington is released from prison and Sheridan reveals in a press conference the details of the plot and those behind it. He later meets with XIII and thanks him for his service.

However while in Japan, XIII and Jones figure out two things. One, Ross Tanner's family didn't exist; the photos were faked. Second, XIII has a final flashback; Number I wasn't Wax but Wally Sheridan. Sheridan had his own sister killed to get the Vice President into the office. He then with the rest of the conspirators, coordinated attacks that made the President look bad in order to win a landslide victory, so they can turn the United States down the path to an authoritarian dictatorship.  XIII, realizing they have been duped and it is not over, looks at Jones and says, "We're going back."

The XX

Cast

Broadcasters

Critical reception
At Metacritic, the miniseries has a weighted average score of 44 out of 100 based on 6 critics, indicating "mixed or average reviews". Its best reviews came from The Hollywood Reporter, who said "All in all, this isn't a half-bad political thriller." On the other side, USA Today said "Poorly cast and performed (including an embarrassing turn by Val Kilmer), XIII is shot so murkily and staged so badly, you can hardly tell where people are, let alone where they're going."

References

External links

2008 action thriller films
2000s English-language films
Films shot in Hamilton, Ontario
Films shot in Toronto
Films based on Belgian comics
Canadian thriller television films
Canadian action thriller films
English-language Canadian films
Films about amnesia
Adaptations of works by Jean Van Hamme
Live-action films based on comics
Canal+ original programming
Films about terrorism in the United States
Films set in Washington, D.C.
Films set in Montana
Films set in West Virginia
Films set in Montgomery County, Maryland
French television films
French action thriller films
English-language French films
2008 films
Films directed by Duane Clark
2000s Canadian films
2000s French films